Episteme maculatrix  is a species of moth of the family Noctuidae. It was described by John O. Westwood in 1841.

References 

Agaristinae
Moths described in 1841